Charles Bedford Morris (December 29, 1931 – August 22, 1996) was a United States Army soldier and a recipient of the United States military's highest decoration—the Medal of Honor—for his actions in the Vietnam War.

Biography
Morris joined the Army from Roanoke, Virginia, in 1953, and briefly served during the Korean War before serving in Vietnam. By June 29, 1966, he was a sergeant in Company A, 2d Battalion (Airborne), 503rd Infantry Regiment, 173d Airborne Brigade (Separate). During a firefight on that day in the Republic of Vietnam, Morris continued to lead his squad, fight the enemy, and help the wounded despite being wounded himself four separate times. For his actions during the battle, he was promoted to staff sergeant and, on December 14, 1967, awarded the Medal of Honor.

Morris reached the highest enlisted rank, sergeant major, before retiring from the Army. He died at age 64 and was buried in Morris Cemetery, Fancy Gap, Virginia.

Medal of Honor citation

Staff Sergeant Morris' Medal of Honor citation reads:

See also

List of Medal of Honor recipients
List of Medal of Honor recipients for the Vietnam War

References

1931 births
1996 deaths
United States Army personnel of the Vietnam War
United States Army Medal of Honor recipients
United States Army soldiers
People from Carroll County, Virginia
Vietnam War recipients of the Medal of Honor